Gladys Guarisma (30 August 1938 – 12 February 2022) was a Venezuelan linguist. She worked at the French National Centre for Scientific Research (CNRS) and was one of the pioneers of African linguistics.

Biography
Guarisma joined the CNRS and was recruited by Jacqueline M.C. Thomas to join her research team, which later became known as LACITO. She was known as a specialist of Bantu languages in Cameroon, such as the Bafia language, of which she published a phonology in 1967. In 1992, she published a thesis titled Le bafia (rì-kpāɂ). She also studied the Vute language, on which she published a study in 1978. After her retirement, she continued her scientific activities for many years.

Guarisma died on 12 February 2022, at the age of 83.

Publications
 Dialectométrie lexicale de quelques parlers bantous de la zone A, in: La méthode dialectométrique appliquée aux langues africaines (1986)
La Méthode dialectométrique appliquée aux langues africaines (1986)
Le Bafia (r-kpâɂ) (1992)
Complexité morphologique, simplicité syntaxique : le cas du bafia, langue bantoue (A 50) du Cameroun (2000)

References

1938 births
2022 deaths
Linguists from Venezuela
People from Ciudad Bolívar
Place of death missing